Cristina Deutekom (28 August 1931 – 7 August 2014) was a Dutch operatic coloratura soprano.

She sang with many of the leading tenors of her time, including Carlo Bergonzi, José Carreras, Franco Corelli, Plácido Domingo, Nicolai Gedda, Alfredo Kraus, Mario del Monaco, Luciano Pavarotti, and Richard Tucker.

Life
Deutekom was born Stientje Engel in Amsterdam.
She studied at the Conservatorium van Amsterdam with Coby Riemersma and Felix Hupka.
In 1963 she made her debut with De Nederlandse Opera as Queen of the Night in Mozart's The Magic Flute. After some lesser roles with the company, she contemplated giving up singing altogether, since her career did not seem to progress.

During a performance of Der Rosenkavalier in Spain – in which she was singing the small role of Marianne Leitmetzerin  – Christine was overheard warming up with the Queen of the Night aria in her dressing room by Elisabeth Schwarzkopf, who was singing the Marschallin in that night's performance. Story has it that Schwarzkopf opened the door and asked: "Child, do you know what you are singing there?" and was shocked to hear that she was not performing this role all over the world. "I do not think much of any impresario, that does not recognize such talent", she said and introduced her to her own manager, Rudi Rothenberg.
She then went on to conquer the major opera houses in succession with the Queen of the Night. After her performance at the Royal Opera House, Covent Garden, the authoritative Opera magazine reviewed her performance, saying: "Except for Maria Callas in her prime, we have hardly heard anything of equal quality here before". In 1968 she took to the Metropolitan Opera, New York and was acclaimed by The New York Times to be "the greatest Queen of the Night of our time".
In 1974 she opened the Met season as Elena in I vespri siciliani alongside Plácido Domingo.

Besides the Queen of the Night, her Mozart roles included Donna Anna in Don Giovanni, Fiordiligi in Così fan tutte and Vitellia in La clemenza di Tito. She sang the great bel canto roles, specifically in Rossini's Armida, in Bellini's Norma and I puritani, and in Donizetti's Lucia di Lammermoor.

She went on to the great dramatic Verdi roles including Abigaile in Nabucco, Lady Macbeth, Leonora in Il trovatore, Amelia in Un ballo in maschera, and Elena in I vespri siciliani. Other roles which were captured in commercial recordings include Giselda in I Lombardi and Odabella in Attila. Finally, she sang the title roles in Cherubini's Médée and Puccini's Turandot.

Deutekom decided to end her stage career on the last day of 1986, after having heart problems during a performance of the opera Amaya in Bilbao. She turned to giving master classes internationally.

She made a return in November 1996 at the Concertgebouw , at the age of 65 singing the Bolero from I vespri siciliani and Anna Elisa's aria  from the operetta Paganini, reportedly "bringing the house down". As of 2001, she was a guest teacher at the Royal Conservatory of The Hague, but following a stroke in 2004, she retired from public life.

On 26 October 2011, a tribute gala concert for her initiated by baritone Ernst Daniël Smid was staged at the Royal Theater Carré. This was the soprano's last public appearance.

Vocal technique

For fast coloratura passages, Deutekom developed a glottal-stop technique which was both admired and derided. Some people described it as a type of yodeling, while others criticized it and dubbed "cluckatura."

Personal life 

She married Jacob "Jaap" Deutekom, a boxer, in 1952 and they had a daughter, Irma, born in 1955.
Deutekom died on 7 August 2014 after a fall in her home.

Additional operatic repertoire

Honors

References

External links 

Discography 
Interview with Cristina Deutekom, October 15, 1986

1931 births
2014 deaths
Musicians from Amsterdam
Dutch operatic sopranos
Accidental deaths from falls
Knights of the Order of Orange-Nassau
20th-century Dutch women opera singers
Conservatorium van Amsterdam alumni